St. Maurice Plantation was a historic mansion on a plantation off the banks of the Red River of the South in Winn Parish, Louisiana, USA.

History
The house was built for the Prothro family, and it was completed in 1845. It was designed in the Greek Revival architectural style. By 1850, members of the Prothro family and their African slaves died of the yellow fever. A decade later, during the American Civil War of 1861–1865, the plantation was taken over by the Union Army.

It has been listed on the National Register of Historic Places since April 3, 1979. It was destroyed by fire on June 5, 1981. It was removed from the National Register in January 2019.

References

Houses on the National Register of Historic Places in Louisiana
Greek Revival architecture in Louisiana
Houses completed in 1845
Buildings and structures in Winn Parish, Louisiana
Antebellum architecture
Plantation houses in Louisiana
Former National Register of Historic Places in Louisiana